Eutrichillus pini is a species of longhorn beetles of the subfamily Lamiinae. It was described by Schaeffer in 1905.

References

Beetles described in 1905
Acanthocinini